The Arrondissement of Namur is one of the three administrative arrondissements in the Walloon province of Namur, Belgium. It is both an administrative and a judicial arrondissement. The territory of the Judicial Arrondissement of Namur coincides with that of the Administrative Arrondissement of Namur.

Municipalities

The Administrative Arrondissement of Namur consists of the following municipalities:

 Andenne
 Assesse
 Éghezée
 Fernelmont
 Floreffe
 Fosses-la-Ville
 Gembloux
 Gesves

 Jemeppe-sur-Sambre
 La Bruyère
 Mettet
 Namur
 Ohey
 Profondeville
 Sambreville
 Sombreffe

Demography

References

Namur
Articles which contain graphical timelines